Kate Schatz is an American feminist writer, activist, and educator. She is the creator of the Rad Women book series, along with illustrator Miriam Klein Stahl. Her children's book, Rad American Women A-Z, was published by City Lights in Spring 2015 and spent a combined 11 weeks on the New York Times bestseller list. The follow-up book, Rad Women Worldwide, was published in September 2016, and debuted at #8 on The New York Times Best Seller list. Rad Girls Can was published by Ten Speed Press on July 17, 2018, and Rad American History A-Z was published by Ten Speed Press on March 3, 2020.

Her book of fiction, Rid of Me: A Story, was published in 2006 as part of the 33 1/3 series; it is based on the 1993 PJ Harvey album of the same title. Her work has been published in LENNY, BuzzFeed, Quartz, Oxford American, Joyland, East Bay Express, and San Francisco Chronicle, among others. Her short story "Folsom, Survivor" was a 2010 Notable Short Story in The Best American Short Stories 2011. Her essay "What I Mean, Or Dear White People" was published in the 2017 anthology Radical Hope: Letters of Love and Dissent in Dangerous Times.

She was a co-founder and organizer of Solidarity Sundays, a nationwide network of community-based feminist activist organizations. She is a co-founder of The Encyclopedia Project, and is the former Chair of the School of Literary Arts at Oakland School for the Arts. Kate received her MFA in Fiction Writing from Brown, and a double BA in Women's Studies/Creative Writing from UC Santa Cruz. She lives in Alameda, CA, with her partner and children.

Selected works
 Do the Work: An Antiracist Activity Book (co-authored with W. Kamau Bell) (2022)
 Rad American History A-Z (2020)
 Rad Girls Can (2018)
 My Rad Life: A Journal (2017)
 Rad Women Worldwide (2016)
 Rad American Women A-Z (2015)
 Folsom, Survivor (2010)
 Rid of Me: A Story (2006)

References

21st-century American women writers
Brown University alumni
Living people
University of California, Santa Cruz alumni
Year of birth missing (living people)
21st-century American writers
American children's writers
American women children's writers